The Ligurian regional election of 1975 took place on 15 June 1975.

Events
The Italian Communist Party was the largest party, largely ahead of Christian Democracy. After the election, Communist Angelo Carossino formed a government comprising also the Italian Socialist Party (Frontism). Carossino was replaced by Armando Magliotto in 1979.

Results

Source: Ministry of the Interior

1975 elections in Italy
Elections in Liguria